Ales may refer to:

Places
 Alès, a town and commune in southern France
 Ales, Sardinia, a small town in the province of Oristano on Sardinia in Italy

People with the surname
 Alexander Ales (1500–1565), Scottish theologian
 Mikoláš Aleš (1852–1913), a Czech painter
 John Ales (born 1969), American actor

Other uses
 Aleš, a common Slavic given name
 Ale, a fermented alcoholic beverage
 Ales (automobile), a 1920s Japanese automobile
 Ales Groupe, a French cosmetics company
 Olympique Alès, a French association football (soccer) club based in Alès